William Howson may refer to:

 William R. Howson (1883–1952), Canadian politician and judge
 William Howson (footballer) (born 1892), English professional footballer